The Mediator is a series which contains six novels written by Meg Cabot. The first four novels were originally published under Cabot's pseudonym Jenny Carroll by Simon & Schuster. The last two books were published by HarperCollins and under Meg Cabot's name. This book is romance–fiction for teenagers and young adults.

Cabot stated that she originally planned the series as an eight-book arc, but because of poor sales only got the chance to write six. In several posts on her blog and forums she stated that she has the plot of an "epilogue/sequel" on file, and needs only the time to write it out. The sequel was announced on her blog, detailing that Susannah and Jesse are now engaged and that the book will be an adult installment as opposed to Young Adult, titled Remembrance and is to be released in 2015 to commemorate Shadowland or Love You to Deaths 15th Anniversary. The official publication date for the United States and Canada is February 14, 2016.

Background 
The series follows along with a girl named Susannah "Suze" Simon and her experiences as a teenage mediator - a person who has abilities to see, touch and talk to ghosts, and main goal is to help them to the "Great Beyond" (after life). She is able to travel to the Shadow Land (Land of Damnation). In the end of the series, Suze finds out that she is able to travel in time. The books are written in first-person narrative from Suze's perspective.

Suze's problem is that she was in love with a nineteenth-century ghost known as Hector de Silva, or what she calls him, Jesse. Since he is an undead, no one other than Suze and some other mediators (Paul, Father Dominic, Dr Slaski and Jack there was also a little boy at her job) can see him. Suze frequently recalls that she cannot even introduce him to her parents. 

Jesse's rival is a fellow mediator, Paul, who Suze calls "The Spawn of Satan" and she does not express any feelings for him. He frequently taunts Jesse about his mortality, and states that he is a better person for Suze, stating that Jesse can't even buy her a cup of coffee, or take her to prom.

Publishing history 
 Shadowland (2000, also known in the UK as Love You to Death)
 Ninth Key (2001, also known in the UK as High Stakes)
 Reunion (2001, also known in the UK as Mean Spirits)
 Darkest Hour (2001, also known in the UK as Young Blood)
 Haunted (2004, also known in the UK as Grave Doubts)
 Twilight (2004, also known in the UK as Heaven Sent)
 Every Girl's Dream (2004, short story)
 Proposal (2016, novella)
 Remembrance (2016)

Adaptation 
In a 2020 blog, Cabot confirmed that American-Australian writer and director Sarah Spillane had shown her a script of a possible adaptation of Shadowland. The novels were pitched to Netflix as a film series with a one-hour runtime per book, totaling to seven movies. Filming was planned in 2020, but was delayed due to the COVID-19 pandemic.

External links
Official page on Meg Cabot's website

References 

Book series introduced in 2000
Young adult novel series
American young adult novels
Novels by Meg Cabot
Ghost novels